Eduardo Mosquera (born March 15, 1985), better known by his stage name Eddy Lover, is a Panamanian reggaeton and Spanish reggae singer-songwriter. Eddy Lover rose to international fame with his guest appearance on La Factoría's 2006 smash hit Perdóname.

Biography

Mosquera was born in Panama City, Panama. He began singing at the age of 12 but it was not until 2000 that he recorded his first song called "Lloro" when he participated in the famous Panamanian mix albums Poison and Las Propias. In 2006, Lover signed a record deal with Panama Music. That same year Eddy Lover recorded Prefiero que te Vayas and Vete. Both songs became huge hits in Panama.

Two years later the artist released his debut album Perdóname. The album included songs like Luna, No Debiste Volver and the smash hit Perdóname. La Factoría gave the artist several awards including a Platinum Disc. In March 2011, he released his second album New Age. In 2011, he leaves Panama Music to join Factory Corp. and in 2015 under that same label releases his new studio album, Flow Lover.

Discography

Studio albums
2008: Perdóname
2011: New Age
2015: Flow Lover

EPs
2009: 6 Super Hits

References

External links
 Official Website

1985 births
Living people
21st-century Panamanian male singers
21st-century Panamanian singers
Panamanian reggaeton musicians
Machete Music artists
People from Panama City
Latin music songwriters